Promo.com (a.k.a. Promo by Slidely or previously Slide.ly) is a popular video maker and a cloud-based video creation service that is allowing the creation of videos from stock videos, stock photos,  video clips, and music. The company, that started as Easy Hi Ltd. is based in Tel Aviv, Israel.

History

The company was founded as part of EasyHi Ltd in 2012 by Tom More, as a way to communicate the emotions behind his photos. In June 2012, The company launched Slidely, a web application for users to create video slideshows from their photos and music. In September 2012 it went out of beta and in less than a year, the company reported that over two billion photos were shared using its web service.

In November 2013, Slidely released an app, allowing iPhone mobile users to create videos using pictures on their phone.

In July 2016 the company released its B2B product, PROMO, which provides access to millions of premium quality video clips from world-renowned partners, pre-edited licensed music and a user-friendly interface for customizing messages and logos. Since its release Promo has helped hundreds of thousands of businesses create videos, and the company reportedly doubled its team and became cash-flow positive. In early 2018 the company won Best B2B Product of the year from Product Hunt, for their video creation service, Promo.

In October 2017, the company announced that it acquired Unstock, a mobile-first marketplace for authentic footage, based in Poland.

In January 2019, the company announced changing its name to Promo.com and moving to a new domain .

Business

Promo.com was incorporated in Tel Aviv, Israel in 2012 and employs 50 people as of 2018. In its first year, the company raised $1.5 million in Series A funding

To date, Promo.com raised approximately $13 million in funding rounds led by Benson Oak Capital.

See also
 List of social networking websites

References

External links
 
 Instant Image Resizer

Companies established in 2012
Companies based in Tel Aviv
Cloud infrastructure
Israeli social networking websites
Online companies of Israel